Mulenjan (also Romanized as Mūlenjān) is a village in Qahab-e Shomali Rural District, in the Central District of Isfahan County, Isfahan Province, Iran. At the 2006 census, its population was 557, in 161 families.

References 

Populated places in Isfahan County